Tingena fenestrata is a species of moth in the family Oecophoridae. It is endemic to New Zealand and has been observed in the South Island. This species has been observed in native forest habitat in December.

Taxonomy 
 
This species was first described by Alfred Philpott in 1926 using specimens collected at Dun Mountain and named Borkhausenia fenestrata. George Hudson discussed this species under the name B. fenestrata in his 1928 publication The butterflies and moths of New Zealand. In 1988 J. S. Dugdale placed this species within the genus Tingena. The male holotype is held in the New Zealand Arthropod Collection. Dr Robert Hoare has communicated that this species may belong to the genus  Mermeristis.

Description 

Philpott described this species as follows:

Distribution 
This species is endemic to New Zealand and has been observed in the South Island.

Behaviour 
This species is on the wing in December.

Habitat 
This species has been observed in native forest habitat.

References

Oecophoridae
Moths of New Zealand
Moths described in 1926
Endemic fauna of New Zealand
Taxa named by Alfred Philpott
Endemic moths of New Zealand